Saint Catharine (also Saint Catherine) is an unincorporated community in Washington County, Kentucky, United States. Its ZIP code is 40061.

A post office has been in operation at Saint Catharine since 1900. The community took its name from St. Catharine College.

Notes

Unincorporated communities in Washington County, Kentucky
Unincorporated communities in Kentucky